John Shoffner is an American racing driver, investor, and pilot. In May 2021, he paid for a seat on the Axiom Mission 2 in the SpaceX Dragon 2.

Biography
Shoffner was born in Fairbanks, Alaska. He spent most of his career in Knoxville, Tennessee.
Before creating his own motorsports team J2-Racing in 2012, Shoffner was a businessman. He had a 21-year career with Kentucky-based telecommunications manufacturer Dura-Line. He retired as president in 1997.

Shoffner, an air show pilot, has over 8,500 flight hours in fixed-wing aircraft, decommissioned military aircraft, and helicopters. Shoffner owns a Republic P-47D Thunderbolt named "Wicked Wabbit".

Shoffner has competed in multiple sports including water skiing, cycling (crossing the U.S. in 18 days without support), white water kayaking, hang gliding, and making over 3,000 skydives and base jumps.

Motorsports career  
Shoffner has competed several times in the Nürburgring 24 Hours. In 2016 he finished 19th overall and second in his class (SP7) with a Porsche 991 GT3 Cup. In 2017 he finished 32nd overall and third in his class (SP7) with a Porsche 991 GT3 Cup.

Shoffner has competed with Team GetSpeed since the 2019 VLN Series, driving a Mercedes-AMG GT. He finished in 13th place in 2019 and 10th in 2020.

Shoffner was second in the 2019 Nürburgring Endurance Series Carrera Cup Class Championship. He holds a total of three in-class victories in the Carrera Cup Class.

Space mission 
Shoffner paid for a SpaceX Dragon 2 seat on Axiom Mission 2, commanded by Peggy Whitson, as announced on 25 May 2021. The mission is planned to take place in 2023. He was also the back-up pilot of Axiom Mission 1.

During their week-long mission, Shoffner and Whitson will conduct single-cell genome sequencing demonstrations on the International Space Station for 10x Genomics.

References 

Year of birth missing (living people)
Date of birth missing (living people)
Living people
Space tourists
Axiom Space
Racing drivers from Alaska
FIA GT Championship drivers
Nürburgring 24 Hours drivers